Pho Proeung (1903–1975) was Prime Minister of Cambodia from 1960 to 1961. He was the Minister of Finance in 1955.

References 

 
 

1903 births
1975 deaths
20th-century Cambodian politicians 
Prime Ministers of Cambodia
Finance ministers of Cambodia
People from Phnom Penh
People executed by the Khmer Rouge
Mayors of places in Cambodia
Grand Crosses of the Order of the White Lion